Robert Albertus Kruger (born 28 April 1988 in Johannesburg, South Africa) is a South African rugby union player for NTT Communications Shining Arcs in the Top League in Japan. His regular position is a flanker, but he has occasionally played as a lock or number eight.

Career

Youth

Playing his schoolboy rugby for Standerton High School, Kruger was included in several youth tournaments for his provincial side, the Mpumalanga , playing at the 2004 Under-16 Grant Khomo Week, at the 2005 Under-18 Academy Week and the 2006 Under-18 Craven Week tournaments.

He played for the  team in the 2007 Under-19 Provincial Championship and for the  team in the 2008 Under-21 Provincial Championship.

Golden Lions

With just the two first class matches behind his name, Kruger was drafted into the  Super 14 squad for the 2009 Super 14 season and included in their touring squad that travelled to Australasia. Upon their return to South Africa, Kruger made a further two starts and one appearance off the bench.

Leopards

There, he immediately established himself in the first team in both the Vodacom Cup and Currie Cup competitions.

He was once again called up to the  Super Rugby side for their 2015 Super Rugby season.

He was a member of the  team that won the 2015 Currie Cup First Division. He featured in a total of twelve matches during the 2015 Currie Cup qualification rounds and First Division proper and scored two tries for the side.

He was named the Leopards' Player of the Year for 2015, the second time he received this accolade.

References

South African rugby union players
Living people
1988 births
Rugby union players from Johannesburg
Golden Lions players
Leopards (rugby union) players
Lions (United Rugby Championship) players
Rugby union flankers
Rugby union locks
Rugby union number eights
Urayasu D-Rocks players
Toyota Industries Shuttles Aichi players